Neve Sha'anan (lit. Tranquil Oasis) is a small neighborhood  in central Jerusalem. It is located between the Israel Museum and the Givat Ram campus of the Hebrew University of Jerusalem, bordering Nayot.

History
The first three homes were built in 1929 by the Neve Sha'anan society. The name of the neighborhood was based on Isaiah 33:20. The planning principles were similar to those employed by Ricard Kaufmann, who designed the garden suburbs of Jerusalem during the British Mandate.
 
Two apartment buildings at the end of Neve Sha'anan Street were built to house professors of the Hebrew University.

Landmarks
The Yitzhak Rabin Youth Hostel and Guesthouse is located at the edge of the neighborhood.

Notable residents

A.B. Yehoshua (born 1936), novelist, essayist, and playwright

References

Map of central Jerusalem, with Neve Sha'anan in the center

Neighbourhoods of Jerusalem